A.R.E. Weapons is the debut album by the band of the same name, released on April 1, 2003 on Rough Trade Records. The Sydney Morning Herald wrote that the album "makes like some call out to angry youth, tapping into a spirit of eager rebellion that seems timeless."

Track listing
Don't Be Scared 
Strange Dust
Changes
A.R.E.
Fuck You Pay Me
Headbanger Face
Bad News
Black Mercedes
Street Gang
Hey World

References

2003 debut albums
A.R.E. Weapons albums
Rough Trade Records albums